Ptychohyla salvadorensis (common name: Salvador stream frog) is a species of frog in the family Hylidae found in El Salvador, Guatemala, and Honduras. Its natural habitats are subtropical or tropical moist montane forests, rivers, pastureland, and heavily degraded former forests. It is threatened by habitat loss.

References

S
Amphibians of Guatemala
Amphibians of Honduras
Amphibians of El Salvador
Frogs of North America
Endangered fauna of North America
Amphibians described in 1952
Taxonomy articles created by Polbot